Paisiy Lubenov is a Bulgarian sprint canoer who competed in the late 1980s and early 1990s. He won four bronze medals at the ICF Canoe Sprint World Championships (C-4 500 m: 1990, C-4 1000 m: 1989, 1990, 1991).

References

Bulgarian male canoeists
Living people
Year of birth missing (living people)
ICF Canoe Sprint World Championships medalists in Canadian